Archibald Douglas Russell (May 28, 1853 – November 27, 1919) was an American financier and philanthropist.

Early life
Russell was born on May 28, 1853 in New York City and as a child, lived there and at his parents' summer home in Princeton, New Jersey. He was a son of Helen Rutherfurd (née Watts) Russell (1815–1906) and Archibald Russell (1811–1871), who was born in Edinburgh, Scotland and became a lawyer after studying law with Sir Patrick Fraser Tytler and emigrated to the United States in 1836.  Among his siblings was Anna Watts Russell (wife of Henry Lewis Morris), Eleanor Elliott Russell (wife of Arthur John Peabody, nephew of George Peabody), John Watts Russell, and architect William Hamilton Russell.  His father was also a founder of the American Geographical Society and the Ulster County Savings Institution, near where Russell had his country seat in Ulster County.

His paternal grandparents were Eleanor (née Oliver) Russell and Dr. James Russell, a former president of the Royal Society of Edinburgh.  His mother was the only surviving child of his maternal grandparents, Dr. John Watts and Anna (née Rutherfurd) Watts (daughter of U.S. Senator John Rutherfurd). Through his maternal grandfather, he was a great-grandson of Robert Watts (son of John Watts and brother of U.S. Representative John Watts) and Lady Mary Alexander (daughter of William Alexander, Lord Stirling).

He was educated at private schools in New York before entering the business world.

Career
Russell began his career with Brown Bros. & Co., the established banking firm founded by George Brown in 1818. He later went into partnership, as the senior member, with Douglas Robinson Jr. (husband of Corinne Roosevelt Robinson) and Elliott Roosevelt (father of Eleanor Roosevelt), as Russell, Robinson & Roosevelt, a banking and real estate firm. Douglas and Elliott were the brother-in-law and brother of President Theodore Roosevelt.

He served as the third president, succeeding Morris K. Jessup, of the Five Points House of Industry, of which his father was a founder and the first president.

Russell served as a director of the Farmers' Loan and Trust Company, the Delaware and Hudson Railroad Company, the Title Guarantee and Trust Company, the Greenwich Savings Bank, the United New Jersey Railroad and Canal Company, the Princeton University Press, and the University Power Company. He also served as trustee of Princeton University, a vestryman of Trinity Church, Princeton, the domestic corresponding secretary of the American Geographic Society, and a member of the board of governors of the New York Institute.

Personal life
In 1884, Russell was married to Albertina Taylor Pyne (1859–1918), a daughter of Albertina (née Taylor) Pyne and the English-born Percy Rivington Pyne, the president of National City Bank. Her two brothers were Percy Rivington Pyne II and Moses Taylor Pyne and her grandfather was Moses Taylor, an early president of National City Bank. Together, they were the parents of five children, four of whom survived to adulthood:

 Percy Rivington Pyne Russell (1885–1895), who died aged 9 years and 6 months, in Rome in February 1895.
 Ethelberta Pyne Russell (1887–1952), who married physical chemist Marion Eppley in 1909.
 Archibald Douglas Russell Jr. (1890–1968), who married Mariette Andrews Doolittle, daughter of Julius T. A. Doolittle of Utica, New York and niece of Judge Alfred Conkling Coxe Sr.
 Helen Rutherfurd Russell (b. 1897), who married R. Lawrence Benson in 1919. After his death, she married Joseph S. Clements in 1938.
 Constance Rivington Russell (1899–1983), who married John Gilbert Winant, later the Governor of New Hampshire and U.S. Ambassador to the United Kingdom, in 1919. After his death, she married her late sisters widower, Marion, in 1953.  After Eppley's death in 1960, she married Walter K. Earle, a lawyer with Shearman & Sterling, in 1965.

He was a member of the New York Yacht Club, the Riding Club, the Union Club, the Metropolitan Club, the Century Association and the Princeton Club of New York. His wife was widely known for her contributions that allowed for the construction of the Cathedral Church of Saint Peter and Saint Paul (today known as the Washington National Cathedral) in Washington, D.C.

His wife died at their home, 34 East 36th Street, on February 11, 1918.  Russell died at his home in New York on November 27, 1919.  He was buried at Green-Wood Cemetery in Brooklyn. His entire estate, estimated at $50,000,000, was left to his children.

Residences

In New York, the Russells lived at 34 East 36th Street. In 1903, Russell hired his brother William Hamilton Russell, a partner in the architecture firm of Clinton and Russell, to build Edgerstoune, a Tudor Revival mansion on his Princeton estate. Edgerstoune, which cost between $2,000,000 and $3,000,000 to construct, was located across the street from Drumthwacket the estate of his brother-in-law, Moses Taylor Pyne (and currently the official residence of the governor of New Jersey), and directly adjoining the estates of Junius Spencer Morgan, William T. White, and C. B. Lambert. After his death, the 274-acre Edgerstoune estate was sold by his son-in-law, Governor John Gilbert Winant, to Albert Robertshaw who planned a large real estate development with a country club. Less than a month later, it was sold to Professor John G. Hun, headmaster of the Hun School of Princeton for $350,000.

Descendants
Through his son Archibald, he was a grandfather of A. Douglas Russell III, Louise Russell (wife of John Evelyn duPont Irving) and Isabel Russell (wife of Robert S. Potter).

Through his youngest daughter Constance, he was a grandfather of Constance Winant (1921–1978) (wife of Peruvian scientist Carlos Valando); John Gilbert Winant Jr. (1922–1993) (who served as a bomber pilot in World War II and was taken prisoner by the Germans and sent to Colditz, before his removal in April 1945 as one of the Prominente to be used as a bargaining chip by Himmler and the SS as the end of the war approached; he was eventually released); and Rivington Russell Winant (1925–2011) (who also served in World War II and later became treasurer at the United Nations).

References
Notes

Sources

External links

1853 births
1919 deaths
19th-century American businesspeople
19th-century American Episcopalians
20th-century American businesspeople
20th-century American Episcopalians
American bankers
American corporate directors
American financiers
American people of Scottish descent
American philanthropists
Burials at Green-Wood Cemetery
Businesspeople from New Jersey
Businesspeople from New York City
People from Manhattan
People from Princeton, New Jersey
Princeton University people
Pyne banking family
Rutherfurd family